The Sunshine Coast Gympie Rugby League is the local rugby league competition on Australia's Sunshine Coast. Through SCGRL Limited it serves as the governing body for rugby league on the Sunshine Coast.

History 
The Sunshine Coast Gympie Rugby League started life as the North Coast Rugby League in 1920 after all of the clubs comprising the corresponding rugby union competition changed codes en masse. Among the clubs playing that first season were Pomona, Cooroy, Eumundi, Yandina, Nambour, Woombye, Palmwoods, Buderim and Mooloolah.

In the area served by the SCGRL competition there have been leagues based in Maleny and Gympie

The start to the 2020 season was disrupted by the then recent outbreak of the Coronavirus, which was formally declared a pandemic on 11 March 2020.

On 16 June  of that year it was reported that a number of clubs – including six Division 1 clubs – didn't nominate sides for the 2020 season by the June 15h deadline. The season was eventually cancelled.

The League returned in 2021.

Sunshine Coast Gympie Rugby League Teams
The Sunshine Coast Gympie Rugby League Premiership currently has 16 clubs, for senior and junior divisions.While some clubs field teams in the junior and senior divisions, not all clubs are in the junior division and not all clubs are in the senior division.

Premiership winners

References

External links

Rugby league competitions in Queensland
Sport in the Sunshine Coast, Queensland
Gympie
Recurring sporting events established in 1920
1920 establishments in Australia
Sports leagues established in 1920
Queensland Rugby League